In abstract algebra, an adelic algebraic group is a semitopological group defined by an algebraic group G over a number field K, and the adele ring A = A(K) of K. It consists of the points of G having values in A; the definition of the appropriate topology is straightforward only in case G is a linear algebraic group. In the case of G being an abelian variety, it presents a technical obstacle, though it is known that the concept is potentially useful in connection with Tamagawa numbers. Adelic algebraic groups are widely used in number theory, particularly for the theory of automorphic representations, and the arithmetic of quadratic forms.

In case G is a linear algebraic group, it is an affine algebraic variety in affine N-space. The topology on the adelic algebraic group  is taken to be the subspace topology in AN, the Cartesian product of N copies of the adele ring. In this case,  is a topological group.

History of the terminology
Historically the idèles were introduced  by  under the name "élément idéal", which is "ideal element" in French, which  then abbreviated to "idèle" following a suggestion of Hasse. (In these papers he also gave the ideles a non-Hausdorff topology.) This was to formulate class field theory for infinite extensions in terms of topological groups.  defined (but did not name) the ring of adeles in the function field case and pointed out that Chevalley's group of Idealelemente  was the group of invertible elements of this ring.  defined the ring of adeles as a restricted direct product, though he called its elements "valuation vectors" rather than adeles.

 defined the ring of adeles in the function field case, under the name "repartitions"; the contemporary term adèle stands for 'additive idèles', and can also be a French woman's name. The term adèle was in use shortly afterwards  and may have been introduced by André Weil. The general construction of adelic algebraic groups by  followed the algebraic group theory founded by Armand Borel and Harish-Chandra.

Ideles
Here the set of ideles consists of the invertible adeles; but the topology on the idele group is not their topology as a subset of the adeles. Instead, considering that  lies in two-dimensional affine space as the 'hyperbola' defined parametrically by

 

the topology correctly assigned to the idele group is that induced by inclusion in A2; composing with a projection, it follows that the ideles carry a finer topology than the subspace topology from A.

Inside AN, the product KN lies as a discrete subgroup. This means that G(K) is a discrete subgroup of G(A), also. In the case of the idele group, the quotient group

 

is the idele class group. It is closely related to (though larger than) the ideal class group. The idele class group is not itself compact; the ideles must first be replaced by the ideles of norm 1, and then the image of those in the idele class group is a compact group; the proof of this is essentially equivalent to the finiteness of the class number.

The study of the Galois cohomology of idele class groups is a central matter in class field theory. Characters of the idele class group, now usually called Hecke characters or Größencharacters, give rise to the most basic class of L-functions.

Tamagawa numbers

For more general G, the Tamagawa number is defined (or indirectly computed) as the measure of

G(A)/G(K).

Tsuneo Tamagawa's observation was that, starting from an invariant differential form ω on G, defined over K, the measure involved was well-defined: while ω could be replaced by cω with c a non-zero element of K, the product formula for valuations in K is reflected by the independence from c of the measure of the quotient, for the product measure constructed from ω on each effective factor. The computation of Tamagawa numbers for semisimple groups contains important parts of classical quadratic form theory.

See also
Ring of adeles

References

External links

Topological groups
Algebraic number theory
Algebraic groups